USS Coghlan (DD-326) was a  built for the United States Navy during World War I.

Description
The Clemson class was a repeat of the preceding  although more fuel capacity was added. They had a crew of 6 officers and 108 enlisted men.

Performance differed radically between the ships of the class, often due to poor workmanship. The Clemson class was powered by two steam turbines, each driving one propeller shaft, using steam provided by four water-tube boilers.

The ships were armed with four 4-inch (102 mm) guns in single mounts and were fitted with two 1-pounder guns for anti-aircraft defense. In many ships a shortage of 1-pounders caused them to be replaced by 3-inch (76 mm) guns. Their primary weapon, though, was their torpedo battery of a dozen 21 inch (533 mm) torpedo tubes in four triple mounts. They also carried a pair of depth charge rails. A "Y-gun" depth charge thrower was added to many ships.

Construction and career
Coghlan, named for Joseph Coghlan, was launched 16 June 1920 by Bethlehem Shipbuilding Corporation, San Francisco; sponsored by Mrs. G. Coghlan; and commissioned 31 March 1921. Coghlan arrived at Charleston, South Carolina, 28 December 1921 for operations in East Coast and Caribbean waters. Coghlan took part in the funeral ceremonies for President Warren G. Harding at Washington (7–9 August 1923) and served as a plane guard in the North Atlantic (24 July – 6 September 1924) during the Army's round the-world flight.

From 18 June 1925 to 11 July 1926 she served with U.S. Naval Forces Europe in the Mediterranean protecting American interests. The destroyer returned to her cruising along the east coast and in the Caribbean, served as an exhibition vessel at the Philadelphia Sesquicentennial Exposition during the summer of 1926, cruised with the Special Service Squadron off Nicaragua (3 February – 31 March 1927), and took part in the Presidential Fleet Review, in Hampton Roads, 4 June 1927.

She was decommissioned at Philadelphia 1 May 1930, and sold for scrapping 17 January 1931 under terms of the London Naval Treaty.

Notes

References

External links
http://www.navsource.org/archives/05/326.htm

Clemson-class destroyers
Ships built in San Francisco
1920 ships